Miquelon-Langlade is the larger but less populated of the two communes (municipalities) making up the French overseas collectivity of Saint Pierre and Miquelon, located to the south of Newfoundland in the Gulf of St. Lawrence. It consists of three geological islands: Miquelon, Langlade and Le Cap, connected with tombolos. The communal seat is the settlement of Miquelon, on the northern tip, where the entire island's permanent population of 580 (as of 2019) is located. Miquelon Airport provides flights to Montreal and to nearby Saint-Pierre.

Geography

It comprises three islands connected by tombolos: Le Cap in the north, Miquelon (Grand Miquelon) in the center, and Langlade (Petite Miquelon) in the south.

On the south of the Miquelon Island is a large lagoon known as the Grand Barachois which is host to a large population of seals and other wildlife. Miquelon is also a well known destination for bird watching.

In the eighteenth century it was still possible to sail a boat between Miquelon and Langlade, but by the end of that century La Dune had closed in to form an isthmus between the islands.

The coast of Langlade is lined with steep cliffs, except to the northwest.

Climate
Köppen–Geiger climate classification system classifies its climate as sub-Arctic (Dfc). Summers are mild while winters are cold. It receives precipitation all year.

Etymology

The name Miquelon is of Basque origin and means "Michael", as several fishermen with this name were established in the island. In 1579, the names Micquetõ, Micquelle appeared for the first time in Martin de Hoyarçabal's navigational pilot. The name evolved over time into Miclon, Micklon, and finally Miquelon.

Demographics
The capital of the commune, Miquelon, is located on the north, along a tombolo that connects the formerly separate island of Le Cap with the northwestern part of Miquelon Island. It lies north of a shallow lagoon (barachois) and has a small harbour protected with constructed breakwaters along the eastern side of the isthmus. 

On the northern coast of Langlade, there are settlements in coves of Anse du Gouvernement, Anse aux Soldats and Le Ruisseau Debons, consisting mainly of holiday cottages.

The population of Miquelon-Langlade is mainly of Basque and Acadian ancestry.

Transportation
Miquelon can be reached by boat or by plane from Saint Pierre and is served by Miquelon Airport which is located adjacent to the settlement of Miquelon. The airport is served by Air Saint-Pierre with flights both to Saint-Pierre Airport and Canada.

The main asphalt road runs from the capital along the eastern coast of Miquelon, across the Langlade tombolo and ending in Le Ruisseau Debons on Langlade. A ferry service connects the capital town with Anse du Gouvernement on Langlade in summer months.

Facilities
There is a school facility on the island, Ecole du socle de Miquelon. It houses the private contracted nursery school / preschool Soeur Hilarion, the public elementary school Les Quatre Temps, and the public junior high school Collège de Miquelon. As of the 2014–2015 school year the junior high school had 25 students.

The government high school / sixth-form programmes serving Miquelon are at Lycée-Collège d'État Émile Letournel on Saint-Pierre island.

The Centre Médical de Miquelon has basic medical care facilities for residents, while more advanced services are available on Saint Pierre as well as in St. John's, Newfoundland and Labrador.

See also
 Saint Pierre

References

External links

 Le Phare: Association of Tourism Professionals
 Local Airline Air Saint-Pierre
 2012 French Presidential Election

 
Communes of Saint Pierre and Miquelon